Simo Laaksonen (born 10 September 1998) is a Finnish racing driver, who last competed for MP Motorsport in the 2019 FIA Formula 3 Championship.

Racing record

Career summary

Complete ADAC Formula 4 Championship results
(key) (Races in bold indicate pole position) (Races in italics indicate fastest lap)

Complete GP3 Series results
(key) (Races in bold indicate pole position) (Races in italics indicate fastest lap)

Complete FIA Formula 3 Championship results
(key) (Races in bold indicate pole position; races in italics indicate points for the fastest lap of top ten finishers)

† Driver did not finish the race, but was classified as he completed over 90% of the race distance.

References

External links

 

1998 births
Living people
Finnish racing drivers
ADAC Formula 4 drivers
Euroformula Open Championship drivers
Finnish GP3 Series drivers
FIA Formula 3 Championship drivers
MP Motorsport drivers
People from Marttila
Sportspeople from Southwest Finland
French F4 Championship drivers
Auto Sport Academy drivers
SMP F4 Championship drivers
Koiranen GP drivers
Motopark Academy drivers
Campos Racing drivers